Quercus poilanei is an Asian species of tree in the family Fagaceae. It has been found in northern Indochina (Thailand and Vietnam) and also in the Province of Guangxi in southern China.  It is placed in subgenus Cerris, section Cyclobalanopsis.

Quercus poilanei is a tree up to 16 m. tall. Twigs are orange-brown with a felty coating of hairs. Leaves can be as much as 80 mm long. The acorn is ovoid-ellipsoid or globose, 15-20 × 13–15 mm, with a scar 5–7 mm in diameter.

References

External links
line drawing, Flora of China Illustrations vol. 4, fig. 392, drawings 1-2 at upper left

poilanei
Flora of Guangxi
Flora of Thailand
Flora of Indo-China
Trees of Vietnam
Plants described in 1947
Taxa named by Aimée Antoinette Camus